The inaugural West of England mayoral election was held on 4 May 2017 to elect the Mayor of the West of England metropolitan area. The area is made up of Bath and North East Somerset, Bristol and South Gloucestershire. Subsequent elections will be held every four years. The election was won by Conservative Tim Bowles. The overall turnout for the election was low, with only 29.7% of the electorate voting.

Background

The election coincided with the creation of the West of England Combined Authority, made up of the Bath and North East Somerset, Bristol and South Gloucestershire council areas. North Somerset was not part of the Combined Authority, as its council voted against the devolution deal in June 2016.

Procedure
Bristol City Council acted as the Combined Authority Returning Officer. Formal nominations to stand could be made from 28 March 2017 to 4 April 2017.

This election used the supplementary voting system, with electors having two votes.  One vote for the first choice candidate, with an optional vote for a second choice candidate used if no candidate has more than 50% of the first choice votes.

Campaign

Independent John Savage proposed the development of a "super tram network" for the Combined Authority if elected, as part of a larger public transport policy. He also pledged to write to Channel 4 to ask the channel to consider moving to the West of England. Labour candidate Lesley Mansell promised greater protection for private tenants against "unscrupulous" landlords and 4,000 new homes a year. Conservative Tim Bowles pledged to build more affordable homes and protect the green belt. Liberal Democrat candidate Stephen Williams launched a range of policies with Vince Cable, including rolling out broadband to the region's villages and getting rid of the Severn Bridge toll. Bowles, Mansell and Williams all advocated making the region attractive for business. UKIP's Aaron Foot promised to build an online direct democracy platform and to "end the war on motorists".

Candidates

Six candidates stood in the election.

Conservative Party
Tim Bowles, events company manager, South Gloucestershire councillor.

Green Party
Darren Hall, former RAF engineering officer, project manager, former Parliamentary candidate in Bristol West.

Labour Party
Lesley Mansell, NHS manager, Westfield parish councillor and former Peasedown St John parish councillor.

Liberal Democrats
Stephen Williams, chartered tax consultant, former MP for Bristol West and Parliamentary Under Secretary of State for Communities and Local Government.

UK Independence Party
Aaron Foot, farmer, Coleford parish councillor, 2016 candidate for Avon & Somerset Police and Crime Commissioner.

Independent 
John Savage, businessman, chair of University Hospitals Bristol NHS Foundation Trust and Bristol Chamber of Commerce and Initiative, treasurer of Bristol Cathedral, 2012 Labour candidate for Avon & Somerset Police and Crime Commissioner.

Results

Overall

By local authority

Bath and North East Somerset

Bristol

South Gloucestershire

References

2017 English local elections
Mayoral elections in England
Politics of Bath and North East Somerset
Politics of Bristol
Politics of South Gloucestershire District
2010s in Gloucestershire
2010s in Bristol
2010s in Somerset
May 2017 events in the United Kingdom